Lambert Bernhard Neumaier (13 February 1910 - 8 July 1986) was an Austrian ice hockey player who competed for the Austrian national team at the 1936 Winter Olympics in Garmisch-Partenkirchen.

Playing career
Neumaier made two appearances for the Austrian national team at the 1933 World Ice Hockey Championships. He also played two games for his country at the 1936 Winter Olympics.

He played club hockey for Wiener EV in the Austrian Hockey Championship.

References

1910 births
1986 deaths
Ice hockey people from Vienna
Ice hockey players at the 1936 Winter Olympics
Olympic ice hockey players of Austria